Nkaku Kabi (born 10 July 1973) is the former Minister of Water in Lesotho. He is the current leader of All Basotho Convention. He was the previous Minister of Health in Lesotho.

Background and education 
Nkaku Kabi was born on the 10th of July 1973 at Mazenod in Maseru. Kabi got his First School Leaving Certificate from Mazenod Primary School in 1988 and his Secondary School Certificate from Masianokeng high school in 1994. Kabi received a Bachelor’s Degree in Development Studies and English from the National University of Lesotho and Honours Degree in Development Administration from the University of South Africa.

Career 
Kabi started his career as a tutor in bishop Mohlalisi High School. Thereafter, he worked as a Lecturer in Limkokwing University of Creative Technology. Kabi also served as a Member of Parliament in Lesotho.

References 

Living people
Government ministers of Lesotho
1973 births
People from Maseru